Foreign relations exist between Austria and Italy. Austria has an embassy in Rome, a general consulate in Milan and 10 honorary consulates (in Bari, Bologna, Florence, Genoa, Naples, Palermo, Trieste, Turin, Venice and Verona). Italy has an embassy in Vienna, a consulate in Innsbruck, and 5 honorary consulates (in Graz, Klagenfurt, Bregenz, Linz and Salzburg).

History

Since the Middle Ages, Austria had a great influence over the Italian states, especially in the north of the country. On the other side Italy influenced Austrian culture, architecture and cuisine, many artists and architects like Santino Solari, Martino Altomonte, Giovanni Zucalli, Vincenzo Scamozzi worked and contributed to the Baroque in Austria and most notable in Salzburg.

Since the late Middle Ages, the Italians and Austrians have fought a number of wars, either as enemies or allies. Austria was allied with several Italian states during wars against the Ottoman Empire, e.g. with Tuscany, Mantua, Ferrara, Savoy and the Papal States in the war of 1593–1606, and with Venice in the wars of 1684–1699 and 1716–1718. Austria and the Republic of Venice warred against each other in the Uskok War of 1615–1618.

Since the 18th century, Austria expanded into Italy and ruled various parts of Italy at various times. As a result of the War of the Spanish Succession, the Duchy of Milan and Mantua in northern Italy, and the kingdoms of Naples and Sardinia in southern Italy fell to Austria in 1714. By the Treaty of The Hague of 1720, Austria acquired the Kingdom of Sicily in exchange for Sardinia, which passed to the Duchy of Savoy. During the War of the Polish Succession, Austria lost both Naples and Sicily in 1734, but acquired the Duchy of Parma. During the War of the Austrian Succession, Austria fought against the Republic of Genoa and Duchy of Modena and Reggio, and even briefly occupied Genoa and Modena, however per the Treaty of Aix-la-Chapelle from 1748, the Austrians withdrew from both countries, and also lost Parma. In 1797, in accordance to the Treaty of Campo Formio, Austria lost Milan and Mantua to the newly formed Cisalpine Republic, but gained a portion of the Republic of Venice, which was partitoned between Austria and France, with the Austrian-annexed part forming the new Venetian Province. In 1803, the prince-bishoprics of Trent and Brixen were annexed into Austrian-ruled Tyrol. In 1805, Austria lost the Venetian Province to the Napoleonic Kingdom of Italy, and Trento and Brixen to Bavaria, and the latter two eventually also passed to the Napoleonic Kingdom of Italy in 1810. After the Congress of Vienna, in 1815, Venice, Milan, Mantua, Trento and Brixen fell again to Austria, with the former three included in the newly formed Kingdom of Lombardy–Venetia, and the latter two reannexed into Tyrol.

Austrian rule in northern Italy created the conditions in which Italian nationalism and Austrian interests clashed in the three Wars of Italian Independence between 1848 and 1866 ultimately leading to Italian victory. The Italian struggle against Austria is mentioned in the national anthem of Italy, written in 1847. Tensions remained throughout the 1870s as continued Austrian rule over Italian inhabited lands such as in Trentino and Istria, inflamed Italian nationalism which in turn threatened Austrian integrity; as a result the Austrians built further fortifications along the Italian border. In 1876, the Austrian Archduke Albrecht advocated a preventive war against Italy.

Despite entering into the Triple Alliance of 1882 (along with Germany), areas of clashing interest remained. Italy's improving relations with France, Italian interests in the Balkans, and continuing nationalism among Italians within Austria-Hungary concerned leaders in Vienna. Italy's adherence to the Triple Alliance in the event of war was doubted and from 1903 plans for a possible war against Rome were again maintained by the Austrian general staff. Mutual suspicions led to reinforcement of the frontier and speculation in the press about a war between the two countries into the first decade of the twentieth century. As late as 1911 Count Franz Conrad von Hötzendorf, chief of the Austrian general staff, was advocating a military strike against Austria's supposed Italian allies.

During World War I, Italy fought against Austria-Hungary despite their defensive alliance signed some decades earlier. By World War I's end, Italy emerged victorious and gained territories from Austria, incl. Trento, Brixen and Trieste, and border agreements were secured. During World War II, since 1943, Italian prisoners of war were among Allied POWs held in German POW camps operated in German-annexed Austria, such as Stalag XVIII-A.

Today

Both countries are full members of the Organisation for Economic Co-operation and Development, of the Organization for Security and Co-operation in Europe,  of the European Union and of the Council of Europe. The countries share 420 km of common borders.
Austrian Interior Minister Herbert Kickl said on June 5, 2018 that Italy is a strong ally of Austria.

See also
Foreign relations of Austria
Foreign relations of Italy
Austrians in Italy 
Italians in Austria

References

External links
 Austrian Ministry of Foreign Affairs: list of bilateral treaties with Italy (in German only)
 Austrian embassy in Rome (in German and Italian only)
 Italian embassy in Vienna (in German and Italian only)

 

 
Italy
Bilateral relations of Italy